Scott Dumbrell (born 3 February 1961) is an Australian archer. He competed in the men's individual event at the 1980 Summer Olympics.

References

1961 births
Living people
Australian male archers
Olympic archers of Australia
Archers at the 1980 Summer Olympics
Place of birth missing (living people)